Blaster was FLOW's first major debut single after signing with Ki/oon Records. It reached #12 on the Oricon charts in its first week and charted for 6 weeks. *

Track listing

References

2003 singles
Flow (band) songs
Ki/oon Music singles
2003 songs